Video Vibrations was a 4-hour-long daily video block that showcased popular music videos. It was one of BET's early video shows. The show aired October 1, 1984 until 1997, when it was changed to Vibrations. It was developed to appeal to black audiences and show a wider array of black music than MTV or other networks at the time.

The first video on Video Vibrations was Prince's When Doves Cry. In the beginning, due to a limited supply of videos from black artists, popular mainstream white artists with crossover appeal were also featured in the lineup. As the supply of videos from black artists expanded, so did BET's position as an influential voice of the music industry.

Hosts
The show was hosted by a VJ speaking offscreen.  All 3 hosts were prominent in radio as well.

Alvin "The Unseen VJ" Jones  (1984-1991), one of BET's other first VJ's,alongside Donnie Simpson.
"Captain" Paul Porter (1991-1996).
Lorenzo "Ice Tea" Thomas (1996-1997)

Popular segments
Rap Week - a segment dedicated to hip-hop and rap. Numerous artists were interviewed as well. This was also the inspiration for Alvin Jones to create Rap City.  The show went off the air in 2008.
The Monday Music Marathon - a showcase of music videos by one artist or genre.

Music Intros
The program did not use a theme song or used any recorded tracks until 1991, when they used the single "Mindflux" from the British act N-Joi as their "theme song" for their intros and breaks up until they left the air in 1997.

References 

1984 American television series debuts
1997 American television series endings
1980s American music television series
1990s American music television series
BET original programming